Banco National Park is a national park in Côte d'Ivoire located along Highway North in the district of Attécoubé (Abidjan). Banco National Park covers 30 km2 and is an example of primary forest, with species become rare wood (mahogany, avodirés, ...) Tracks for walkers have been upgraded and many hotels of all categories will allow easy accommodation.

External links
 APES MAPPER 
 World Database on Protected Areas

National parks of Ivory Coast
Abidjan